Malimono, officially the Municipality of Malimono (Surigaonon: Lungsod nan Malimono;), is a 5th class municipality in the province of Surigao del Norte, Philippines. According to the 2020 census, it has a population of 18,852 people.

Geography

Barangays
Malimono is politically subdivided into 14 barangays.
 Bunyasan
 Cagtinae
 Can-aga
 Cansayong
 Cantapoy
 Cayawan
 Doro (Binocaran)
 Hanagdong
 Karihatag
 Masgad
 Pili
 San Isidro (Poblacion)
 Tinago
 Villariza

Climate

Demographics

Economy

References

External links
Malimono Profile at PhilAtlas.com
Malimono Profile at the DTI Cities and Municipalities Competitive Index
[ Philippine Standard Geographic Code]
Philippine Census Information
Local Governance Performance Management System

Municipalities of Surigao del Norte